The Meeting may refer to:

La rencontre (The Meeting) nicknamed Bonjour, Monsieur Courbet, an 1854 painting by Gustave Courbet
The Meeting (Jackie McLean album), 1973 featuring Dexter Gordon
The Meeting (1984 film), a Soviet animated short film
The Meeting (Patrice Rushen album), 1990
The Meeting (Art Ensemble of Chicago album), 2003
"The Meeting" (The Office), a 2009 episode of The Office
The Meeting (play), a 1987 American theatrical play
The Meeting (2012 film), a film starring Rita Dominic
The Meeting (short story), a 1972 science fiction short story by Frederik Pohl

See also
Meeting
Rencontre (disambiguation) (French)
The Meeting Point
The Meeting School
The Meeting Place Church (Winnipeg)
The Meeting Place Cannot Be Changed
The Meeting House
The Last Meeting